The 1938 Liège–Bastogne–Liège was the 28th edition of the Liège–Bastogne–Liège cycle race and was held on 11 May 1938. The race started and finished in Liège. The race was won by Alfons Deloor.

General classification

References

1938
1938 in Belgian sport